Monte Buckland is a prominent peak in Alberto de Agostini National Park, in the Chilean portion of Tierra del Fuego. It towers over a narrow peninsula between Agostini Fjord and Fitton bay, which is an eastward projection of the Gabriel Channel, which separates Dawson Island from Isla Grande de Tierra del Fuego. The mounts Sella, Aosta and Giordano are located to the southeast of Mt Buckland and have distinctive shapes.
  
Phillip Parker King's description of the mountain:

Monte Buckland was climbed in 2012 by a German expedition after several decades since its first ascent.

References

Mountains of Chile
Mountains of Magallanes Region
Isla Grande de Tierra del Fuego